The Yemeni Socialist Party (al-Hizb al-Ishtiraki al-Yamani, YSP) is a political party in Yemen. A successor of Yemen's National Liberation Front, it was the ruling party in South Yemen until Yemeni unification in 1990. Originally Marxist–Leninist, the party has gradually evolved into a social democratic opposition party in today's unified Yemen.

History

South Yemen
The party was established by Abdul Fattah Ismail in 1978 following a unification process of a number of Yemeni revolutionary groups in both South and North Yemen. The core of the YSP came from the Unified Political National Front Organisation – itself the result of merging three parties, namely the National Front for the Liberation of Occupied South Yemen (NLF), the Democratic Popular Union Party (Marxist) and the Popular Vanguard Party (a left-wing Ba'athist party), and from the Yemeni Popular Unity Party in North Yemen – itself the result of merging of five left-wing organisations, namely the Revolutionary Democratic Party of Yemen, the Popular Vanguard Party in North Yemen, the Organisation of Yemeni Revolutionary Resistors, the Popular Democratic Union and the Labour Party. The sole legal party in the country, it won all 111 seats in the parliamentary elections in December 1978.

In power, the YSP was beset by internal divisions. In 1980 Ismail was replaced as President of South Yemen by Ali Nasir Muhammad, who was a more moderate and conciliatory leader compared to the pro-Soviet leftism of Ismail. He sought to improve relations with South Yemen's Arab neighbours and the West. Conflict between the two factions led to the South Yemen Civil War in 1986 which led to the death of Abdul Fattah Ismail, although his ally Ali Salem al Beidh took control of the party, while the more moderate Haidar Abu Bakr al-Attas became president. Al-Beidh and al-Attas would occupy positions in the government of a reunified Yemen until the 1994 civil war. Parliamentary elections were held in October 1986, and although the YSP remained the sole legal party, independent candidates were allowed to contest the elections, winning 40 of the 111 seats, with the YSP winning the other 71.

Unified Yemen
Surviving many upheavals and civil strife in Yemen, the collapse of the Soviet Union, and the crisis of international socialism, the YSP was instrumental in achieving Yemeni unity and the establishment of multi-party democracy in the Republic of Yemen in May 1990. In the first parliamentary elections in unified Yemen in 1993, the YSP won 56 of the 301 seats, finishing third behind the General People's Congress (GPC) and al-Islah. The three parties subsequently formed a coalition government.

Following the 1994 civil war the party's infrastructure and resources were confiscated by the GPC government and its cadres and members were regularly subjected to unwarranted arrests and torture. It boycotted the 1997 parliamentary elections, and was unable to nominate a candidate for the 1999 presidential elections, as any potential candidate required the backing of 31 MPs. In 2002 it was one of five parties to form the Joint Meeting Parties opposition alliance, it returned to contest the 2003 parliamentary elections, it received only 3.8% of the popular vote and won eight seats.

The Joint Meeting Parties nominated Faisal Bin Shamlan as their candidate for the 2006 presidential elections. However, he was defeated by the incumbent President Ali Abdullah Saleh of the GPC.

Yemeni Civil War and split into two factions 
Ahead of the 2012 National Dialogue Conference, designed to deescalate the crisis in Yemen, the party publicly endorsed the implementation of Sharia in Yemen, in a break from the party's secularist origins.

Following the outbreak of the Yemeni Civil War, the party split into two factions; one remained in Yemen and labelled itself the "YSP – Anti-Aggression" and declared its loyalty to the Houthi movement and its leader Abd al-Malik al-Houthi, while much of the party's leadership, including Abdulrahman al-Saqqaf and Yasin Said Numan, went into exile in Riyadh and backed the government of Abdrabbuh Mansur Hadi. After the split, the "Anti-Aggression" faction issued statements that they consider the leadership in Riyadh to have been expelled from the party for of their support of the Saudi-led intervention in Yemen, calling for their punishment as a result.

The "Anti-Aggression" faction declared its opposition to the Saudi-led coalition, vowing to aid the Houthis in defeating it. Notably, this faction of the YSP actively helped facilitate the Houthi entry into Ta'izz during the battle for the city, one of the YSP's historic centers. In 2016, it denounced the United Nations for removing Saudi Arabia from the list of countries responsible for harming children.  They also condemned the Trump administration's decision to designate the Houthis as a terrorist group. 

The pro-Coalition faction of the YSP led by Abdulrahman al-Saqqaf was given two ministers in the Yemeni cabinet following the Riyadh agreement. In 2018, they condemned the STC takeover of Aden and affirmed their support for Hadi's government, calling on Saudi Arabia to intervene in order to reverse the situation. They have, however, also criticized Hadi's government at times, and in 2021, amidst the Houthi assault on Ma'rib, they issued a joint statement with Al-Islah and several smaller parties condemning the government for "[failing] to shoulder its responsibility in the political, military, economic and media fields”.

Ideology
Originally a Marxist–Leninist communist party, the YSP has since moved away from communism and adopted pan-Arab nationalism and social democracy as its main ideologies. The party also supports the implementation of Sharia in Yemen.

General secretaries
 Abdul Fattah Ismail (1978–1980)
 Ali Nasir Muhammad (1980–1986)
 Ali Salem al Beidh (1986–1994)
 Ali Saleh Obad (Moqbel) (1994–2005)
 Yasin Said Numan (2005–2015)
 Abdulraham Al-Saqqaf (2015–present)

Electoral history

South Yemeni parliamentary elections

House of Representatives elections

See also 
Popular Resistance Committees (Yemen)
Southern Movement
Southern Transitional Council
South Yemen insurgency

References

 
Political parties in Yemen